Little Fockers (known as Meet the Parents: Little Fockers in the United Kingdom and Southeast Asia) is a 2010 American comedy film and the third and final film in the Meet the Parents film series, serving as a sequel to Meet the Parents (2000) and Meet the Fockers (2004). The film stars Robert De Niro, Ben Stiller, Owen Wilson, Blythe Danner, Teri Polo, Jessica Alba, Dustin Hoffman and Barbra Streisand.

After the commercial success of the first two films in the franchise, both De Niro and Stiller received a remuneration of $20 million for their roles in Little Fockers.

In addition to the original cast, Little Fockers features Jessica Alba, Laura Dern, Kevin Hart, and Harvey Keitel. Although the film was a box office success, grossing over $310 million worldwide, it earned less than its predecessors and was critically panned.

Plot
Five years after the events of the previous film, Gaylord "Greg" Focker is preparing to celebrate his twins Samantha and Henry's fifth birthday party. Things seem to go awry when Greg's father-in-law Jack Byrnes visits. Recently, he has been diagnosed with a heart condition and become embittered by his daughter Debbie's divorce from her husband Bob (their marriage was the social event in the first film and how he and Greg met), for cheating on her with a nurse. Jack's original plan was to declare Bob his successor as head of the Byrnes family, but he decides to pass the role to Greg, naming him "The Godfocker".

Despite Greg reluctantly accepting the role, Jack resumes his spying on him and begins to suspect him of infidelity when he sees him with drug representative Andi Garcia, who openly flirts with him. This with the presence of Sustengo erection pills in Greg's house prompts Jack to think he is no longer sexually attracted to Pam, his wife. Furthermore, he starts to doubt his ability to provide for his family when he's initially reluctant to send his children to a private school.

During a medical conference promoting Sustengo, Greg meets Bob at a bar, who tells him of Jack's original intention to name him as successor, "The Bobfather". His relief and happiness at leaving Jack's family makes Greg slightly uncomfortable. Meanwhile, Jack speaks to Pam about the possibility of divorcing Greg and renewing her relationship with her ex-fiancé, Kevin Rawley.

Eventually, following a confrontation at a clinic, Greg escapes to his and Pam's unfinished new house, where Andi turns up. She tries to cheer him up with Chinese food and wine, but she drinks too much (also taking many erection pills), making an eccentric, extremely aggressive sexual pass on Greg. Jack, looking for him to apologize and bring him home, pulls up to the house and sees through the window what looks like Greg and Andi having sex. Although, he is actually trying to rebuff Andi's advances. Disgusted, Jack leaves, and tells Dina and Pam that he couldn't find him.

Greg's parents, Bernie and Roz, rejoin the family at the twins' birthday party the next day. Enraged at Greg's apparent infidelity, Jack engages him in a physical fight, despite Greg insisting that Andi was drunk and he was rejecting her. The fight ends with Jack having a heart attack and collapsing.

Greg quickly takes charge of the situation, looking after Jack. As paramedics take him away, Jack quietly admits that he believes him after observing his carotid artery remained stable while Greg was proclaiming his innocence. Impressed with his integrity and quick thinking, Jack approves of him to be "The Gregfocker."

Four months later, on Christmas Day, Greg and Pam's parents come to spend Christmas with them in their new house. Greg's parents (being Jewish) give Jack a kippah as a present, informing him that while they were nursing him back to health they traced his family roots and discovered that he is part Jewish (which does not impress Jack).

Bernie informs Greg and Pam that he and Roz have sold their Miami home and are moving to Chicago, only two houses down from theirs. Jack and Dina decide they will move too, because they also want to be close to their grandchildren. Greg and Pam try to wean their respective parents off the idea. During the mid-credits scene, Jack views YouTube videos of Greg publicly mocking Jack during a speech promoting Sustengo.

Cast
 Robert De Niro as Jack Byrnes
 Ben Stiller as Greg Focker
 Owen Wilson as Kevin Rawley
 Dustin Hoffman as Bernie Focker
 Barbra Streisand as Roz Focker
 Blythe Danner as Dina Byrnes
 Teri Polo as Pam Focker
 Jessica Alba as Andi Garcia
 Laura Dern as Prudence
 Kevin Hart as Nurse Louis
 Daisy Tahan as Samantha Focker
 Colin Baiocchi as Henry Focker
 Thomas McCarthy as Dr. Bob
 Harvey Keitel as Randy Weir
 Yul Vazquez as Junior
 Olga Fonda as Svetlana
 Rob Huebel as Sleazy Doctor
 John DiMaggio and Jordan Peele as E.M.T.s
 Deepak Chopra as himself
 Nick Kroll as Young Doctor

Production
Production for Little Fockers began in July 2009.

Writer John Hamburg stated the film would deal with "themes of death and divorce and all these real things that, as we get older, we start to think about, but in a really comical way."

Outside the United States, this is the first film in the series to be released by Paramount Pictures, whose 2006 acquisition of the DreamWorks back catalog included co-ownership of and sequel rights to the Meet the Parents franchise. DreamWorks remains a copyright co-holder, as "DW Studios," with Universal Pictures.

On August 24, 2010, it was announced that Dustin Hoffman would be reprising his role as Greg's father, Bernie Focker. The studio failed to reach salary terms with Hoffman until principal photography had wrapped. As a result, his role in the film is significantly smaller than that in the previous entry.

Release
In January 2010, the release date for the film was pushed back from July 30, 2010, to December 22, 2010, nominally because Universal hoped to benefit from the long Christmas weekend; it was later revealed to be deliberately delayed as such because it was only at the time of the delay announcement that Hoffman elected to reprise his character, and the producers had to adjust the filming schedule to accommodate for the filming of his scenes, keeping the announcement secret until the aforementioned August reveal.

The first trailer was released on June 24, 2010, preceding showings of Grown Ups and Dinner for Schmucks. A second trailer, released November 10, 2010, was attached to Morning Glory, Unstoppable and Skyline. The film was released in the UK and US on December 22, 2010.

Critical reception
On Rotten Tomatoes, the film has an approval rating of 9% based on 148 reviews and an average rating of 3.4/10. The site's critical consensus reads, "As star-studded as it is heartbreakingly lazy, Little Fockers takes the top-grossing trilogy to embarrassing new lows." On Metacritic, the film has a score of 27 out of 100 based on 32 critics, indicating "generally unfavorable reviews". Audiences polled by CinemaScore gave the film an average grade of "B−" on an A+ to F scale.

On each website, it is Streisand's lowest-rated film. Empire gave two stars out of five, summing up, "there are inevitably moments when Hoffman or Wilson get a laugh, but on the whole, it’s the same again, but weaker and with fewer good jokes."

Box office performance
Little Fockers didn't match the opening-weekend gross of its predecessor, Meet the Fockers. It opened first on its opening weekend on approximately 5,000 screens at 3,536 locations across US and Canada, bringing its five-day opening to $48.3 million. By comparison, Meet the Fockers made $46.1 million on the same weekend in 2004 for a five-day total of $70.5 million. Little Fockers grossed $148.4 million in the United States and Canada, and $162.2 million from other countries around the world, for a worldwide total of $310.7 million, making this the lowest grossing film in the trilogy.

Accolades

Home media

Little Fockers was released on DVD and Blu-ray on April 5, 2011.

References

External links

 
 
 
 
 Little Fockers at Metacritic
 

2010s American films
2010 films
2010 comedy films
2010s English-language films
American comedy films
American sequel films
American Christmas films
DreamWorks Pictures films
Films scored by Stephen Trask
Films about dysfunctional families
Films with screenplays by John Hamburg
Films directed by Paul Weitz
Films produced by Robert De Niro
Films set in Chicago
Films set in Spain
Films shot in Chicago
Golden Raspberry Award winning films
Hanukkah films
Midlife crisis films
Paramount Pictures films
Relativity Media films
Universal Pictures films